Boyle Heights, historically known as Paredón Blanco, is a neighborhood in Los Angeles, California, located east of the Los Angeles River. It is one of the city's most notable and historic Chicano/Mexican-American communities and is known as a bastion of Chicano culture, hosting cultural landmarks like Mariachi Plaza and events like the annual Día de los Muertos celebrations.

History

Boyle Heights was called  ("White Bluff") during the Spanish, Mexican, and early American periods. During Mexican rule, what would become Boyle Heights became home to a small settlement of relocated Tongva refugees from the village of Yaanga in 1845. The villagers were relocated to this new site known as Pueblito after being forcibly evicted from their previous location on the corner Alameda and Commercial Street by German immigrant Juan Domingo (John Groningen), who paid Governor Pío Pico $200 for the land.

On August 13, 1846, Los Angeles was seized by invading American forces during the Mexican–American War. Under American occupation, Indigenous elimination became a core principal of governance and the Pueblito site was razed to the ground in 1847: "the Indians were required to live in dispersed settlements or with their employers in the city." The destruction of Pueblito was reportedly approved by the Los Angeles City Council and largely displaced the final generation of the villagers, known as Yaangavit, into the Calle de los Negros ("place of the dark ones") district.

The area became named after Andrew Boyle, an Irishman born in Ballinrobe, who purchased  on the bluffs overlooking the Los Angeles River after fighting in the Mexican–American War for $4,000. Boyle established his home on the land in 1858. In the 1860s, he began growing grapes and sold the wine under the "Paredon Blanc" name. His son-in-law William Workman served as early mayor and city councilman and also built early infrastructure for the area.

To the north of Boyle Heights was Brooklyn Heights, a subdivision in the hills on the eastern bank of the Los Angeles River that centered on Prospect Park.

From 1889 through 1909 the city was divided into nine wards. In 1899 a motion was introduced at the Ninth Ward Development Association to use the name Boyle Heights to apply to all the highlands of the Ninth Ward, including Brooklyn Heights and Euclid Heights. XLNT Foods had a factory making tamales here early in their history. The company started in 1894, when tamales were the most popular ethnic food in Los Angeles. The company is the oldest continuously operating Mexican food brand in the United States, and one of the oldest companies in Southern California.

In the early 1910s, Boyle Heights was one of the only communities that did not have restricted housing covenants that discriminated against Japanese and other people of color. The Japanese community of Little Tokyo continued to grow and extended to the First Street Corridor into Boyle Heights in the early 1910s. Boyle Heights became Los Angeles’s largest residential communities of Japanese immigrants and Americans, apart from Little Tokyo. In the 1920s and 1930s, Boyle Heights became the center of significant churches, temples, and schools for the Japanese community. These include the Tenrikyo Junior Church of America, the Konko Church, and the Higashi Honganji Buddhist Temple; all  designed by Yos Hirose. The Japanese Baptist Church was built by the Los Angeles City Baptist Missionary Society. A hospital, also designed by Hirose, opened in 1929 to serve the Japanese American community.

By the 1920s through the 1960s, Boyle Heights was racially and ethnically diverse as a center of Jewish, Mexican and Japanese immigrant life in the early 20th century, and also hosted significant Yugoslav, Armenian, African-American and Russian populations. Bruce Phillips, a sociologist who tracked Jewish communities across the United States, said that Jewish families left Boyle Heights not because of racism, but instead because of banks redlining the neighborhood (denying home loans) and the construction of several freeways through the community.

In 1961, the construction of the East LA Interchange began. At 135 acres in size, the interchange is three times larger than the average highway system, even expanding at some points to 27 lanes in width. The interchange handles around 1.7 million vehicles daily and has produced one of the most traffic congested regions in the world as well as one of the most concentrated pockets of air pollution in America. Since the 1920s, both elite and working-class communities throughout Southern California have witnessed the enforcement of highly effective racial covenants and other exclusionary measures that aim to distinguish separate white and non-white neighborhoods. This resulted in the development of Boyle Heights, a multicultural, interethnic neighborhood in East Los Angeles whose celebration of cultural difference has made it a role model for democracy.

In 2017, some residents were protesting gentrification of their neighborhood by the influx of new businesses, a theme found in the TV series Vida and Gentefied, both set in the neighborhood.

Demographics

As of the 2000 census, there were 92,785 people in the neighborhood, which was considered "not especially diverse" ethnically, with the racial composition of the neighborhood at 94.0% Latino, 2.3% Asian, 2.0% White (non-Hispanic), 0.9% African American, and 0.8% other races. The median household income was $33,235, low in comparison to the rest of the city. The neighborhood's population was also one of the youngest in the city, with a median age of just 25.

As of 2011, 95% of the community was Hispanic and Latino. The community had Mexican Americans, Mexican immigrants, and Central American ethnic residents. Hector Tobar of the Los Angeles Times said, "The diversity that exists in Boyle Heights today is exclusively Latino".

Latino communities

Latino political influence

The emergence of Latino politics in Boyle Heights influenced the diversity in the community. Boyle Heights was a predominantly Jewish community with "a vibrant, pre-World War II, Yiddish-speaking community, replete with small shops along Brooklyn Avenue, union halls, synagogues and hyperactive politics ... shaped by the enduring influence of the Socialist and Communist parties" before Boyle Heights became predominantly associated with Mexicans/Mexican Americans. The rise of the socialist and communist parties increased the people's involvement in politics in the community because the "liberal-left exercised great influence in the immigrant community". Even with an ever-growing diversity in Boyle Heights, "Jews remained culturally and politically dominant after World War II".

Nevertheless, as the Jewish community was moving westward into new homes, the largest growing group, Latinos, was moving into Boyle Heights because to them this neighborhood was represented as upward mobility. With Jews and Latinos both in Boyle Heights, these men, part of the Jewish Community Relations Council (JCRC) — Louis Levy, Ben Solnit, Pinkhas Karl, Harry Sheer, and Julius Levitt — helped to empower the Latinos who either lived among the Jewish people or who worked together in the factories.

The combination of Jewish people and Latinos in Boyle Heights symbolized a tight unity between the two communities. The two groups helped to elect Edward R. Roybal to the City Council over Councilman Christensen; with the help from the Community Service Organization (CSO). In order for Roybal to win a landslide victory over Christensen, "the JCRC, with representation from business and labor leaders, associated with both Jewish left traditions, had become the prime financial benefactor to CSO .. labor historically backed incumbents ... [and] the Cold War struggle for the hearts and minds of minority workers also influenced the larger political dynamic".

In the 1947 election, Edward Roybal lost, but Jewish community activist Saul Alinsky and the Industrial Areas Foundation (IAF) garnered support from Mexican Americans to bring Roybal to victory two years later 1949.(Bernstein, 243) When Roybal took office as city councilman in 1949, he experienced racism when trying to buy a home for his family. The real-estate agent told him that he could not sell to Mexicans, and Roybal's first act as councilman was to protest racial discrimination and to create a community that represented inter-racial politics in Boyle Heights.(Bernstein, 224).

This Latino-Jewish relationship shaped politics in that when Antonio Villaraigosa became mayor of Los Angeles in 2005, "not only did he have ties to Boyle Heights, but he was elected by replicating the labor-based, multicultural coalition that Congressman Edward Roybal assembled in 1949 to become Los Angeles's first city council member of Latino heritage". Further, the Vladeck Center (named after Borukh Charney Vladeck) contributed to the community of Boyle Heights in a big way because it was not just a building, it was "a venue for a wide range of activities that promoted Jewish culture and politics".

Government and infrastructure

The Los Angeles County Department of Health Services operates the Central Health Center in Downtown Los Angeles, serving Boyle Heights.

The United States Postal Service's Boyle Heights Post Office is located at 2016 East 1st Street.

The Social Security Administration is located at 215 North Soto Street Los Angeles, CA 90033 1-800-772-1213

Transportation
Boyle Heights is home to four stations of the LA Metro:
Mariachi Plaza station
Soto station
Pico/Aliso station
Indiana Station

Education

Just 5% of Boyle Heights residents aged 25 and older had earned a four-year degree by 2000, a low percentage for the city and the county. The percentage of residents in that age range who had not earned a high school diploma was high for the county.

Public
 SIATech Boyle Heights Independent Study, Charter High School, 501 South Boyle Avenue
 Extera Public School, Charter Elementary, 1942 E. 2nd Street and 2226 E. 3rd Street
 Extera Public School #2, Charter Elementary, 1015 S. Lorena Street 
 Francisco Bravo Medical Magnet High School, alternative, 1200 North Cornwell Street
 Theodore Roosevelt High School, 456 South Mathews Street
 Mendez High School 1200 Playa Del Sol
 Animo Oscar De La Hoya Charter High School, 1114 South Lorena Street
 Boyle Heights Continuation School, 544 South Mathews Street* Central Juvenile Hall, 1605 Eastlake Avenue
 Hollenbeck Middle School, 2510 East Sixth Street
 Robert Louis Stevenson Middle School, 725 South Indiana Street
 KIPP Los Angeles College Preparatory, charter middle, 2810 Whittier Boulevard
 Murchison Street Elementary School, 1501 Murchison Street
 Evergreen Avenue Elementary School, 2730 Ganahl Street
 Sheridan Street Elementary School, 416 North Cornwell Street
 Malabar Street Elementary School, 3200 East Malabar Street
 Breed Street Elementary School, 2226 East Third Street
 First Street Elementary School, 2820 East First Street
 Second Street Elementary School, 1942 East Second Street
 Soto Street Elementary School, 1020 South Soto Street
 Euclid Avenue Elementary School, 806 Euclid Avenue
 Sunrise Elementary School, 2821 East Seventh Street
 Utah Street Elementary School, 255 Gabriel Garcia Marquez Street
 Bridge Street Elementary School, 605 North Boyle Avenue
 Garza (Carmen Lomas) Primary Center, elementary, 2750 East Hostetter Street
 Christopher Dena Elementary School, 1314 Dacotah Street
 Learning Works Charter School, 1916 East First Street
 Lorena Street Elementary School, 1015 South Lorena Street
 PUENTE Learning Center, 501 South Boyle Avenue
 East Los Angeles Occupational Center (Adult Education), 2100 Marengo Street
 Endeavor College Preparatory Charter School, 1263 S Soto St, Los Angeles, CA 90023

Private

 Bishop Mora Salesian High School, 960 South Soto Street
 Santa Teresita Elementary School, 2646 Zonal Avenue
 Assumption Elementary School, 3016 Winter Street
 Saint Mary Catholic Elementary School, 416 South Saint Louis Street
 Our Lady of Talpa, elementary, 411 South Evergreen Avenue
 East Los Angeles Light and Life Christian School, 207 South Dacotah Street
 Santa Isabel Elementary School, 2424 Whittier Boulevard
 Dolores Mission School, elementary, 170 South Gless Street
 Cristo Viene Christian School, 3607 Whittier Boulevard
 Resurrection, elementary, 3360 East Opal Street
 White Memorial Adventist School, 1605 New Jersey Street
 PUENTE Learning Center, 501 South Boyle Avenue

Landmarks

Existing 
 Breed Street Shul, which was declared a historic-cultural monument in 1988 
 Self-Help Graphics and Art, the first community-based organization in the country to create a free public celebration of Day of the Dead
 Los Angeles County+USC Medical Center/Keck School of Medicine of USC
 Los Angeles County Department of Coroner
 Estrada Courts Murals
 Evergreen Cemetery
 Hazard Park
 Mariachi Plaza
 Hollenbeck Park
 Linda Vista Community Hospital (Now Hollenbeck Terrace Apartments, former Santa Fe Coast Lines Hospital)
 Sears Building, Olympic Boulevard and Soto St.
 Malabar Public Library
 Lucha Underground Temple, where the television program Lucha Underground is taped.
 St. Mary's Catholic Church (4th and Chicago Streets)

Demolished 
 Soto-Michigan Jewish Community Center
 Aliso Village
 Sisters Orphan Home, operated by Daughters of Charity of Saint Vincent de Paul, 917 S. Boyle Ave. demolished due to earthquake damage and construction of freeway

Notable people

Politics

 Sheldon Andelson, first openly gay person to be appointed to the University of California Regents or any high position in state government
 Hal Bernson, Los Angeles City Council member, 1979–2003
 Martin V. Biscailuz, attorney and Common Council member, 1884–85
 Howard E. Dorsey, City Council member, 1937
 Oscar Macy, county sheriff and member of the Board of Supervisors
 Edward R. Roybal, Democrat in the U.S. House of Representatives for the 30th District and later for the 25th District of California; member of the Los Angeles City Council
 Winfred J. Sanborn, City Council member, 1925–29
 Antonio Villaraigosa, Mayor of Los Angeles
 Zev Yaroslavsky, Los Angeles County Board of Supervisors, 3rd District

Sports

Lillian Copeland (1904–1964), Olympic discus champion; set world records in discus, javelin, and shot put
 William Harmatz, jockey
Ron Mix (born 1938), Football Hall of Famer
 Donald Sterling, Former Los Angeles Clippers owner

Crime 
  Mickey Cohen, gangster

Arts and culture

 Oscar Zeta Acosta, attorney, writer, community activist
 Lou Adler, record producer, manager
 Herb Alpert
 Greg Boyle, Catholic priest, community activist
 Norman Granz
 Josefina López, writer
 Anthony Quinn, actor
 Andy Russell, international singing star
 Julius Shulman, photographer
 Taboo, rapper
 will.i.am, recording artist and music producer

Publishing

Jack T. Chick, publisher of Chick tracts

In popular culture
 1917: Nuts in May
 1957: The Pajama Game
 1979: Boulevard Nights
 1980: The Other Side of the Bridge
 1987: Born in East L.A.
 1992: American Me
 1993: Blood In Blood Out
 1995: Dangerous Minds
 1998–2009 Breaking the Magician's Code: Magic's Biggest Secrets Finally Revealed
 2007: Under the Same Moon
 2008: The Take
 2011: A Better Life
 2014–present: Lucha Underground
 2015: East LA Interchange (documentary)
 2015/2016: No más bebés
 2018–2020: Vida
 2020–2021: Gentefied
 2021: Night Teeth

See also

 List of Los Angeles Historic-Cultural Monuments on the East and Northeast Sides
 List of districts and neighborhoods in Los Angeles

References

Further reading

Boyle Heights: How a Los Angeles Neighborhood Became the Future of American Democracy.  George F. Sanchez.  Berkeley: Univ. of Calif. Press, 2021.

External links

 Boyle Heights Neighborhood Council
 Boyle Heights Beat
 Self Help Graphics & Art
 CASA 1010 Theater
 Boyle Heights: Power of Place
 History of Aliso Village
 Breed Street Shul Project, Inc.
 Boyle Heights Learning Collaborative
 Boyle Heights Historical Society
 Comments about living in Boyle Heights
 Boyle Heights crime map and statistics

 
Chicano and Mexican neighborhoods in California
Neighborhoods in Los Angeles
Eastside Los Angeles
1875 establishments in California
Populated places established in 1875
Historic Jewish communities in the United States
Jews and Judaism in Los Angeles